The 1984 United States Senate election in Alabama was held on November 6, 1984. 

Incumbent Democratic Senator Howell Heflin was easily re-elected to a second term.

Democratic primary

Candidates
 Charles W. Borden, dentist
 Howell Heflin, incumbent U.S. Senator
 Margaret Stewart, perennial candidate

Results

Republican primary

Candidates
 Doug Carter, Birmingham businessman
 Joseph Keith, Montgomery surgeon
 Albert L. Smith Jr., former U.S. Representative
 Clint Wilkes

Results

General election

Results

See also 
 1984 United States Senate elections

References 

1984
Alabama
United States Senate